Ming Hsieh (born 1956) is a billionaire Chinese-born American entrepreneur and philanthropist. He is the founder of Cogent Systems in 1990.  In 2011, he founded a genetic testing technology company. According to Forbes magazine, his estimated net worth exceeds $1.6 billion, ranking him the 198th richest person in America and 562nd among The World's Richest People In 2006.

He also owns the Sanlorenzo Ocean Dreamwalker Yacht.

Early life
Ming Hsieh was born in 1956. His parents were Baoyan and Sun Hsieh. His family originated in Guangzhou (Canton). Hsieh was raised in Shenyang, the capital city of Liaoning province in Northeast China. His family was persecuted during the Cultural Revolution as a part of China's upper middle class having ties with the Nationalist government and moved to Taiwan (Yingzhou, Ming's grandfather, was a high-ranking official of Republic of China). As a result, his family was forced to move in 1966 to a small village near Panjin. At the age of 10, Hsieh's formal education stopped for the next ten years. During that period, Hsieh learned the trade of electrical engineering from his formally trained father as they built a crude power system for the village they were assigned to and did odd repair work.

Hsieh's uncle, P.Y. Hsieh, had left China and earned a Master of Science in mechanical engineering from the University of Southern California in 1952 before working for TRW.  Knowing of this, Hsieh decided to follow his uncle and, after two years at the South China Institute of Technology in Guangzhou and with an inheritance from his grandparents in Taiwan, he transferred to USC's engineering program at age 24.  Hsieh earned his Bachelor of Science in Electrical Engineering from USC in 1983 and MSEE in 1984. His parents wanted him to continue and earn a Ph.D., but Hsieh decided to first work a few years.

Career
Hsieh began work as a circuit designer for International Rectifier.  After two and a half years, he decided to start his own business. He founded Cogent Systems Inc. which offered fully automated, high-speed biometric fingerprint system.  The company began receiving numerous government contracts and now includes the Department of Homeland Security, Federal Bureau of Prisons, FBI and Royal Canadian Mounted Police amongst its customers.

He was elected a member of the National Academy of Engineering in 2015 for the development and commercialization of biometric identification systems.

Philanthropy
In October 2006, Hsieh donated $35 million to USC's Viterbi School of Engineering's Department of Electrical Engineering, 100 years after the department and school's founding.  In honor of his donation, the department was renamed the USC Ming Hsieh Department of Electrical Engineering.  In October 2010, Hsieh donated $50 million to USC for cancer research.  He is on the USC Board of Trustees.

In November 2007, Hsieh donated $5.5 million, cash and in-kind, to West Virginia University's Eberly College of Arts and Sciences Department of Forensic Investigative Sciences, one of only ten in the nation.  WVU houses the largest Crime Scene Training Complex in the country.  In honor of his donation, WVU named a building on their downtown campus, Ming Hsieh Hall.

In February 2014, he donated $1 million US to the Children's Hospital Los Angeles.

Personal life
Hsieh is a naturalized U.S. citizen. He is married to Eva Hsieh, and they reside in Pasadena with their two children. Hsieh also has two adult children from a previous marriage.

References

External links
Putting a Fingerprint on Electrical Engineering: Cogent co-founder Ming Hsieh gives $35 million gift to name the Viterbi School’s oldest and largest department, October 22, 2006.
50 Million Endowment to Fund the New USC Ming Hsieh Institute, usc.edu.
The 400 Richest Americans: #198 Ming Hsieh, Forbes.com.
The World's Richest People: #562 Ming Hsieh, Forbes.com.

1955 births
Living people
Businesspeople from Shenyang
People from Beverly Hills, California
Chinese emigrants to the United States
American billionaires
American computer businesspeople
American philanthropists
American technology chief executives
American technology company founders
USC Viterbi School of Engineering alumni
Members of Committee of 100
American people of Chinese descent
Naturalized citizens of the United States